The 1958 LFF Lyga was the 37th season of the LFF Lyga football competition in Lithuania.  It was contested by 12 teams, and Elnias Šiauliai won the championship.

League standings

References
RSSSF

LFF Lyga seasons
1958 in Lithuania
LFF